Chris Ferrie (born 1982) is a Canadian physicist, mathematician, researcher, and children's book author.

Ferrie studied at the University of Waterloo in Waterloo, Ontario Canada, where he earned a BSc in mathematical physics, a masters in applied mathematics, and a PhD in applied mathematics on Theory and Applications of Probability in Quantum Mechanics from the Institute for Quantum Computing and University of Waterloo.

From 2013 to 2014 he worked as a postdoctoral fellow at the Center for Quantum Information and Control of the University of New Mexico.

From 2015 to 2017 he was a postdoctoral research associate and since 2017 he has been working as a senior lecturer at the Centre for Engineer Quantum Systems of the University of Technology Sydney.

Ferrie is the creator and author of the children's book brand Baby University, a series of board books and picture books that introduce complex subjects to children.

In 2017, Ferrie joined the production of a 52-episode online video course titled "Physics For Babies". In the video series, Dr. Chris and Mengmeng, an animated koala, together introduce some basic concepts of physics such as quantum physics, optics and electromagnetism to school age kids through stories, classes and interactive games. The series was produced by Mecoo Media in Australia and was broadcast from May 2017 to May 2018 on China’s online platforms. This is also the first marketing of Dr. Chris’ image in the Chinese market.

From February 2018 to November 2019, Ferrie worked with CCPPG (China Children's Press & Publication Group) and Mecoo Media and published a 50 book series "Red Kangaroo Thousands Physics Whys". The series explains various science phenomenons around kids’ everyday life in simple terms through lively conversation between Dr. Chris and a very cute Red Kangaroo. The series cover 5 themes including everyday physics, quantum physics, newtonian physics, optical physics and aerodynamics. This set of books has become a must read book for children in many kindergartens in China. Sourcebooks has preempted world English rights to the Red Kangaroo series in 2018.

On 30 April 2020 Ferrie announced that he was joining an Australian science podcast called Sci-gasm.

Ferrie is married and father of four children.

Books

Awards 
 Australian Research Council Discovery Early Career Researcher Award (2017)

External links 
 Official website
 Baby University on the Sourcebooks website
 Chris Ferrie on the website of Loewe Verlag
 Christopher Ferrie on the website of University of Technology, Sydney
 Chris-Ferrie on the website of Book Repository

References 

 

1983 births
Canadian children's writers
21st-century Canadian physicists
21st-century Canadian mathematicians
Living people
Canadian science writers
21st-century Canadian non-fiction writers